Amaury da Costa e Rocha (7 January 1923 – 31 July 1991) was a Brazilian sports shooter. He competed in the 25 metre pistol and 50 metre pistol events at the 1960 Summer Olympics.

He was the brother of fellow sports shooter Adhaury Rocha.

References

External links
 

1923 births
1991 deaths
Brazilian male sport shooters
Olympic shooters of Brazil
Shooters at the 1960 Summer Olympics